Cressier railway station may refer to:

 Cressier FR railway station in Cressier, Fribourg, Switzerland
 Cressier NE railway station in Cressier, Neuchâtel, Switzerland